Ron Galotti is an American former magazine executive. He was a corporate Vice President at Condè Nast and the publisher of such Newhouse owned publications as Vogue, GQ and Vanity Fair. Galotti famously left Condè Nast to found Talk magazine with editor Tina Brown, where he was president of the company. Talk became a symbol of old-school excess and failed less than three years after its launch. The company was backed by Harvey Weinstein, who reportedly invested 50 million dollars of personal capital. After Talk folded, Galotti returned to Condè Nast to run GQ for about two years before retiring to Vermont.

Background
The Bronx-born Galotti was raised in Peekskill, Westchester County, New York. His parents ran a liquor store. Young Ron raised chickens and earned a five-year   4-H pin from the Yorktown Grange.  His only known sibling was a sister (born with Down syndrome) who is now deceased. Galotti's father died when Ron was nine years old. After barely managing to graduate from high school, he enrolled in the Air Force, at the height of the Vietnam War. He was stationed for more than 3 years in the Philippines, rising to the rank of sergeant. He earned income by loan-sharking and later opened a brothel with the usury proceeds.

Relocation 
After his last magazine position at GQ, Galotti sold his homes in Manhattan and Long Island, and relocated, around 2004, with his family to a farm in North Pomfret, Vermont.

Inspiration for "Mr. Big" 
He is generally considered to be, and has been cited by New York magazine as, the real-life inspiration for the character of "Mr. Big" (played by actor Chris Noth) on HBO's Sex and the City (based on the books of the same name by Candace Bushnell).

References

Living people
American media executives
American people of Italian descent
Businesspeople from New York (state)
Year of birth missing (living people)
People from the Bronx
People from Pomfret, Vermont
Military personnel from New York City